Earl Larkin Williams (August 22, 1903 – February 7, 1974) was an American astronomer and mathematician.

Early life and education
Earl Larkin Williams was born August 22, 1903. He received his A.B. in 1924 and his A.M. a year later, both from Swarthmore College. He also studied at the University of Pennsylvania, Ohio State University, and the University of Michigan.

Career
In addition to working at The George Washington University, Williams held positions as an Instructor in Mathematics and Astronomy at Muhlenberg College (1925–26), Instructor of Astronomy at Ohio State University (1920–1931) and Assistant Professor of Astronomy at Denison University for one semester in 1931. Beyond his employment as a professor, Williams also held a position as the Assistant Latitude Observer of U.S. Coast and Geodetic Survey operating an observatory at Gaithersburg, Md. from 1932 to 1941. He was a member of the American Astronomical Society, the International Astronomical Union, the American Geophysical Union, Gamma Alpha, Sigma Xi (associate), and Pi Delta Epsilon. Earl Larkin Williams wrote a few newspaper articles in 1941 on total solar eclipse expeditions. He also wrote in the Transactions of the International Astronomical Union in 1935 On the Instrumental Adjustment of a Zenith Telescope, in which he proposed a new method of offsetting the effect of flexure by making the middle thread of the telescope follow the meridian precisely at all zenith distances. Williams was appointed as an Associate of Mathematics at The George Washington University in 1941. In 1945, he became a Lecturer in Mathematics until 1948. He again became an Associate of Mathematics from 1948 through 1949. Williams then became and remained a Lecturer in Mathematics from 1949 until his resignation from the university January 31, 1955.

Death and afterward
According to the obituary in the Washington Post, Williams died on February 7, 1974, and was buried in the Gartner Sandison Funeral Home in Maryland. Because Earl Larkin Williams was only employed by The George Washington University for fourteen years and only as a Lecturer and Associate in Mathematics, there is a limited knowledge about his accomplishments.  Williams is mentioned in the 1946 Cherry Tree Yearbook as a member of the math faculty and he is mentioned in the 1946 George Washington University Bulletin. The only information on Williams’ achievements at George Washington is found in his personal records in the archives section of the library.

Marriage and children
Williams married Helen Ball Shawaker on June 9, 1931, in Columbus, Ohio. Helen was born May 12, 1905, in Columbus, Franklin County, Ohio. She died March 29, 1972, in Gaithersburg, Maryland. Helen was the daughter of Frank Albert Schauweker. Helen and Earl had four children: Judith Jane, Keith, Linda A. and Greg.  Earl Helen and Greg were cremated and their cremains are with Linda in Vermont.

References

Obituary. The Washington Post (Feb. 8, 1974).  Proquest.Web. December 7, 2010.
RG0004, Vice President for Academic Affairs records, Series 20, Box-13, Folder 36. Special Collections Research Center. George Washington University.
The George Washington University Bulletin, Vol. XLIV, No. 4. The Catalogue Issue. Published in June.
William, Earl Larkin. Transactions of the International Astronomical Union. Volume 5,1935.

External links
George Washington University Gelman Library Special Collections Research Center

1903 births
1974 deaths
George Washington University faculty
Swarthmore College alumni
Ohio State University faculty